The  Union of the Forces of Change (UFC) is a political party in Guinea. The party is led by Aboubacar Sylla who is the current Minister of State and Minister of Transport. The party won two seats at the 2020 parliamentary election.

References

Political parties in Guinea